"I'll Be Back Up on My Feet" is a song by Sandy Linzer and Denny Randell, which was recorded by The Monkees during the 1960s.

The first Monkees version of the song was recorded on October 26, 1966, during the period when the band did not have control over their recordings. This version was produced by Jeff Barry, and was used in two first-season episodes of their series, "Dance, Monkees, Dance", episode 14 and "Monkees In the Ring", episode 20. (In the former, the show's credits mistakenly listed the title as "I'll Be Back On My Feet Again"). The recording was slated to be included on More of the Monkees, but was pulled from the album's lineup, and never originally released.

During 1967 and 1968, the Monkees remade several of their earlier songs, including "Valleri" and selections that appeared on their Headquarters album, after the band gained control over the production of their records. During sessions for their Pisces, Aquarius, Capricorn & Jones Ltd. album, the Monkees attempted a remake of "I'll Be Back Up on My Feet", but did not complete it.

The next version of the song was recorded on March 9 and March 14, 1968. It was markedly different from the first version, including the use of a brass section and an extra chord change (from D Major to D minor, where the first version had stayed on D Major). This version appeared on their 1968 album The Birds, The Bees, & The Monkees.

The original recording was finally released in 1990, as part of the compilation album Missing Links, Volume II, which featured many of the "television versions" of the Monkees' songs.

1966 songs
The Monkees songs
Songs written by Sandy Linzer
Songs written by Denny Randell